The different types of bladed weapons (swords, dress-swords, sabers, rapiers, foils, machetes, daggers, knives, arrowheads, etc..) have been of great importance throughout history. In addition to its use for fighting, or in wars, the bladed weapons have been the object of special considerations forming part of funerary rituals, mythology and other ancestral traditions.

History 
The present chronology is a compilation that includes diverse and relatively uneven documents about different families of bladed weapons: swords, dress-swords, sabers, rapiers, foils, machetes, daggers, knives, arrowheads, etc..., with the sword references being the most numerous but not the unique included among the other listed references of the rest of bladed weapons.

Bronze Swords 

The first known bronze swords with a length equal to or greater than 60 cm date from the 17th century BC in regions of the Black Sea and the Aegean Sea. A sword must be constructed from the correct alloy, have the right shape, and have the necessary thermal (and finishing) treatments applied to it for it to be useful in combat. In a longer sword, the stresses (bending and buckling) are more important. What is needed is a weapon that is hard enough (to cut), fairly flexible (without being fragile) and quite durable enough to withstand blows.

The manufacturing process is summarized as follows: The bronze swords were cast into moulds, heated to a certain temperature and allowed to cool slowly before being cold hammered (a process whereby they are hit with a hammer on a type of anvil) to increase their hardness.
 c.1275 BC. Assyrian sword, with inscriptions.
 c.650 BC. According to Pausanias, Theodore of Samos invented the casting of bronze objects.

5th century BC-5th century AD 

 c.450 BC. Herodotus. He mentioned iron swords (as a representation of the god Ares/Mars) in Scythian people's tombs
 c.401 BC. He described the Indian steel (Wootz steel) and two swords made with that material.
 326 BC. Battle of the Hidaspes River. Alexander defeated King Porus, who gave him about 10 kg of "Indian steel" (Wootz steel).
 c.230 BC. Philo of Byzantium In his treatise Belopoeica (artillery), he describes the flexibility of the swords of the Celts and Iberians in Hispania. An elastic behavior, such as a spring, would imply some tempered steel content in the mentioned swords.
 216 BC. Battle of Cannae Polybius described the swords of the Iberians (good for cutting and thrusting) and those of the Gauls (good for cutting).
 197 BC. The Gauls were defeated by the Romans, led by Gaius Cornelius Cetegus near the River Clusius (perhaps the current Brembo River). In spite of the numerical superiority of the Gauls, their swords were bent at the first blow and had to be straightened. The Romans took advantage of this weakness to win the battle.
 c.20 BC. Diodorus Siculus was a Greek historian of Sicily that lived in the 1st Century BC, and a contemporary of Julius Caesar and Augustus. His comments on the celtiberian swords indicate the cut quality and an aspect of their manufacture.
 c.5 BC. Gratio Falisco, in his poem Cynegeticon, mentions the knives of Toledo: "... Ima toledano praecingunt ilia cultro ..."

 c.50. Pliny the Elder  talks about the types of iron, and the importance of water in the temper of steel.
 c.90 AD The poet Martial, born in Bilbilis (near Calatayud), prided himself on the steel of his country, better than the Gallic and the Noricum.

Middle Ages 

 c.500. Ship wrecked near Nydam (Denmark) with a cargo of swords of the type "pattern-welded".
 c.700. According to a Japanese legend from the province of Yamato, the sword maker Amakuni was concerned that many swords were broken in battle. And after days of work and prayer, he modified the forging and tempering process by getting swords that were curved and did not break in combat.
 796. The emperor Charlemagne rendered the king Offa of Mercia with a sword made by Huns, obtained like war loot. 
 802. Harun al-Rashid possessed a sword of great quality, called Samsam or Samsamah. Supposedly it was a sword that had belonged to a king of Yemen. Nikephoros I, the Byzantine Emperor, sent him a few swords of Byzantine manufacture, indicating that he no longer wanted to pay the tribute. Harun broke them all with his Samsam sword, and he did not blunder the least.
 c.850. Abu Yusuf well Ishaq al-Kindi describes the swords of Damascus.
 c.900. First documentaries of the katana. Master Yasu-tsuna (from Hoki)
 966. Embassy of Borrell II to To the-Hàkam II. giving a present of 100 "frank swords", very famous and feared.
 1146. Earliest clear references to naginata.
 1233. Jaume I mentions the sword called "Tiso" (forged in Monzón in the siege of Burriana.
 1248. Sword Lobera  of the king Fernando III de Castilla.
 1274. Sword of the knight Soler de Vilardell (Sword of Vilardell). A sword considered magical, "of virtue". Its cut quality indicates a very successful manufacturing process. 
 1370. Last will of Pere el Cerimoniós with the sword of Sant Martí and the sword of Vilardell.
 1392. Ibn Hud Ibn Hudhayl, in his work " Gala de caballeros y blasón de paladines ", mentions two types of quality swords: those of Indian steel and those of the francs (Catalan) . The latter with exceptional qualities and supposedly forged by genius.
 1425. The sword makers of Valencia asked for confirmation of their ordinations, copied from those of the sword makers of Barcelona.
....Item. Senyor los dits privilegis, capítols e ordinacions vees(?) plaurets a Déu a justícia (e) egualtat car axí son stats obtenguts per la spaseria de ciutat vostra de Barchinonae per vos atorgats (a) aquella segons han pres los prohomens de la spaseria de la dita vostra ciutat de Valencia...1425...Alfonsi Dei gratia Regis Aragonum, Sicilie, Valencie, Majoricam, Sardinie et ...
 Examination of applicants for master of sword making:
They had to present:“4 fulles d’espases e recapte per a guarniment de aquelles. Ço és la una fulla de dues mans la qual haie a guarnir vermella. E l’altra fulla sia de una mà la qual haie a esser guarnida mitadada de dues colors. E l’altra de una mà que sia buydada e guarnida tota negra. E la quarta ço és un estoch d’armes tot blanch los quals guarniments se vien(?) e haien a fer per lo volent usa(n)t de la dita spaseria dins la casa e habitació de un dels dits diputats...”
 1433. Barcelona. In the "Book of the councils" of the guild of sword makers, the way of tempering the leaves of the swords is indicated.
 In folio f_099r and others of the "Guild book of the sword makers" appears the expression  "confrare ho confraressa" . Apparently a woman could belong to the guilt of sword makers. Maybe only as the wife or widow of a sword maker.

1450-1700 

 1474. The fencing teacher of Majorca Jaume Ponç was the author of a fencing treatise published in Perpinyan.
 1478. References of the sword maker Julián del Rey. Related to the famous swords with the mark of the "perrillo" (supposedly a stylized dog).  He probably was the same persona as a former Muslim armourer who was baptised and under the protection of Fernando el Católico, who worked in Zaragoza and Toledo.
 1509. Marriage of Catalina of Aragon and Henry VIII of England. Swords of the armoury of Zaragoza presented to the English king
 1517. Superiority of the sword over other weapons in the war of the conquistadores against the Native Americans in Florida.
 1522. Sword of Ignacio de Loyola offered to the Virgin of Montserrat.
 1525. Battle of Pavia. Francis I of France surrendered his sword to Joan Aldana, a cavalier native of Tortosa.
 1540. "Pirotechnia", work of Vannoccio Biringuccio, armourer of Siena. Among other topics it deals with some iron mines and the reduction of the mass in a forge with bellows.
 c.1541. Sword of Francisco Pizarro, made in Valencia by the armourer Mateo Duarte.
 1544. Hunting saber of Henry VIII of England, decorated by Diego Çaias.
 1546. Georgius Agricola (Latinized name of Georg Bauer). Work "De Natura Fossilium" which deals with mineralogy. He talks about iron exporting regions and the area of ??Noricum (now Steyr in Austria) that produced steel for the quality of the mineral. In other places (Bilbao, Turassio in Spain and Como in Italy) steel would be "manufactured" by the quality of the water.
 1547. Mentioned the sword called "de San Martí". (See year 1370)
 1547. Law agreed on the maximum length of the sword-blades of Mallorca, Valencia and Catalonia.
 1599. The Pope Clement VIII gives a sword of Solingen as a present to the king Henry IV of France.
 1611. Oldest definition of a cinquedita. (“Cinquedita: a weapon but five fingers long used in Venice”. Similar to a sgian-dubh. So the modern definition of Cinquedea should be inaccurate.).

1700-1950 

 1742. "Dictionnaire Universel De Commerce", Jacques Savary des Bruslons, Philémon-Louis Savary. French name of the composite leaves with iron core and steel exterior ("lame de ettofe").
 1750. News about the "varnished iron" or "iron" mines of Mondragón.
 1760. Carlos III of Spain orders to Luis de Urbina, infantry colonel, a report on the bladed weapons factories of Toledo, Valencia, Zaragoza and Barcelona (in precarious state) to establish a new factory in Toledo
 1761. " Bladed weapons Factory of Toledo" (Fábrica de armas blancas de Toledo), created by decree of Carlos III of Spain. It was organized and directed by the Valencian sword's master Lluis Calisto, contracted expressly.
 1766. Esquilache Riots 
 1772. Henry Nock was the founder of a gun-making company. He bequeathed to his manager James Wilkinson, maker of the famous swords and sabers.
 1772. Rules for Californian presidios. Soldado de cuera. Cutting arms. Broad sword and lance characteristics.
 1781–1782. For the armament of the Presidio of Santa Barbara (California) the swords of Toledo are rejected and they are asked for German, Valencian or Barcelona swords, more suitable for military tasks. According to Felipe de Nieve report English by Richard S. Whitehead): "... Uniforms are in deplorable shape due to the fact that supply ships have not arrived. Much of the equipment is defective. Safeties on the pistols are inoperative and The swords of Toledo are so tempered that they can be broken to pieces if they are used carelessly. ".
 1782. William Bowles, "Introduction to Natural History and the Physical Geography of Spain." With information on the making of swords in Spain.
 1793–1795. War of the Pyrenees. The weapon workshops in Catalonia, are opened again.
 1798. History of the political economy of Aragon. Ignacio Jordán de Assó. talks about the sword makers of Zaragoza .
 1804. James Wilkinson.
 1844. Henry Wilkinson
 1849. "Barcelona General Guide"; Manuel Saurí, José Matas. Describes the sword of the guild of sword makers of Barcelona (60 inches long, 24 inches to the crosshead), which required a strong man to carry it in parades.
 1851. Sword of Toledo (of Manuel de Ysasi) presented to the Great Exhibition of London. It could be unsheathed and sheathed in a nearly circular sheath.
 1856. Details of the manufacture of swords (according to the Toledo Factory).
 1865. Henry George O'Shea. "A guide to Spain". List of swords of the armoury of the Royal Palace of Madrid (at the time of the publication of the work). 
 1943. Sword of Stalingrad

References

External links 

 Chronology of the swords. Information on the different types.

Swords
History of technology